Worawora is a town in the Oti Region of Ghana. It forms part of the Biakoye district. The town is known for the Worawora Secondary School.  The school is a second cycle institution.

Education

References

Populated places in the Oti Region